Tucuhuachana (possibly from quechua tuku owl, wacha birth, to give birth, -na a suffix, "where the owl is born") is mountain in the Carabaya mountain range in the Andes of Peru, about  high. It is located in the Puno Region, Carabaya Province, Ituata District. Tucuhuachana lies southwest of Pumajolluni, northeast of Queroni and southeast of Allpajata. The little lake east of it is named Vilajota (possibly from Aymara for "red lake").

References 

Mountains of Puno Region
Mountains of Peru